Carex abscondita, the thicket sedge, is a North American species of sedge first described by Kenneth Mackenzie in 1910. It grows along the central and eastern United States, from eastern Texas to southern Missouri, east to the Atlantic coast, and north to New Hampshire. It grows in moist areas of forests, shrublands, and swamps.

It is closely related to and sometimes confused with Carex digitalis, which, compared to Carex abscondita, has longer flowering stems relative to the leaves, wider staminate spikes, and often has thinner leaves.

References

abscondita
Plants described in 1910